M. Basavaraju ( 1 November 1927 - 10 May 1994) was an Indian politician of the Indian National Congress. He was also member of Karnataka Legislative Assembly and member of Rajya Sabha (the upper house of the Parliament of India).

Early life and background 
M. Basavaraju was born on 1 November 1927 in Gandanahalli of Karnataka. He completed his education from intermediate college of Mysore.

Personal life 
M. Basavaraju married Shrimati Chikkananjammanni in 1955. The couple had six children which include 4 sons and 2 daughters.

Political career 
Basavaraju stepped into politics and became the member of Karnataka Legislative Assembly (1967 - 1972) and member of Rajya Sabha from 3 April 1980 to 2 April 1986.

Position held

Death 
Basavaraju died on 10 May 1994 at the age of 66.

References 

1927 births
1994 deaths
Indian politicians
Indian National Congress politicians
Indian National Congress politicians from Karnataka